Erwise is a discontinued pioneering web browser, and the first available with a graphical user interface.

Released in April 1992, the browser was written for Unix computers running X and used the W3 common access library. Erwise was the combined master's project of four Finnish students at the Helsinki University of Technology (now merged into Aalto University): Kim Nyberg, Teemu Rantanen, Kati Suominen and Kari Sydänmaanlakka. The group decided to make a web browser at the suggestion of Robert Cailliau, who was visiting the university, and were supervised by Ari Lemmke.

The development of Erwise halted after the students graduated and went on to other projects. Tim Berners-Lee, the creator of the World Wide Web, travelled to Finland to encourage the group to continue with the project. However, none of the project members could afford to continue with the project without proper funding.

The name Erwise originates from otherwise and the name of the project group, OHT.

Development 
For the web to be popularized, Tim Berners-Lee knew that what people wanted was a GUI-based browser - one that could target multiple operating systems, and most importantly, be easy-to-use for the technologically-challenged. At the time, personal computers were also confusing to some people that were not experienced with technology.

History
 Extremely pre-documented (in Finnish).
 Serious coding started around March 1992.
 Alpha release available by anonymous FTP from info.cern.ch—binaries only (sun4 works, decstation too, display requires Motif) as of 15 April 1992.
 Source code released on www-talk August 92.

Characteristics
The following are significant characteristics of the browser:

 It used a multi-font text.
 The links of Erwise browser were underlined. To visit the links you had to double click on the links.
 Erwise could execute multiple window operation, though the optional single window mode was also available.
 Erwise could open local files.
 Erwise had little English documentation.
 Some of the buttons were for features that were not implemented.
 Tim Berners-Lee would have continued with the works of Erwise. He could not do so because Erwise's code was documented in the Finnish language.

Criticism
Erwise crashed on some versions of Unix, which Berners-Lee attributed to poor Motif implementations.

See also

 ViolaWWW

References

Sources
 Berners-Lee, Tim: Weaving the Web .

External links
 The source code at FUNET FTP archives 

1992 software
Discontinued web browsers
Finnish inventions
Free software programmed in C
History of the Internet
POSIX web browsers
Public-domain software with source code
Software developed in Finland